Fabrice Alcebiades Maieco (born 30 May 1977 in Benguela), commonly known as Akwá, is an Angolan former football player who played as a forward for the Angolan national team.
From his international debut in 1995, Akwá represented Angola 78 times, scoring a record 39 goals. He played for them in three Africa Cup of Nations and captained the side at the 2006 FIFA World Cup.
Akwá has a brother, Rasca, who was a professional football player for Atlético Sport Aviação in Angola.

Club career

Akwá played for three football clubs in Portugal at the start of his career: Benfica, F.C. Alverca, and Académica de Coimbra. He.spent four years in Portugal before moving to Qatar where he had the most successful period of his career.

He spent seven years there, playing for three different teams in the Qatar Stars League. He played for Al-Wakrah, Al-Gharrafa and Qatar SC. In his time in Qatar he won the Arab Champions League, Qatar Crown Prince Cup and was the league's top scorer in 1999 with 11 goals. After leaving Al-Wakrah for the second time in 2006, he remained unattached until 2007, when he moved to Angolan club Petro Atlético. Akwá remained there for one season before retiring from professional football.

Club Carrer Stats

International career

Akwá won his first cap for Angola in 1995 against Mozambique. He accumulated 78 caps in total, scoring 39 goals. One was the winning goal that sent Angola to their first ever World Cup. He played in all 3 of Angola's games at the 2006 World Cup, but did not score, and they were eliminated from their group. Akwá retired from international football after the tournament.

National team statistics

International goals
Scores and results list Angola's goal tally first.

Politics
Akwa is currently a member of the Angolan legislative assembly. He is interested in major developments in sports in Angola.

Honours

Individual
Qatar Stars League: Top scorer 1998–99
Best stranger player in Qatar: 1999, 2004, 2005
Angolan Player Of The Year: 2006

Clubs
Qatar Crown Prince Cup: 1999, 2000, 2002, 2004
Cheikh Qassim Cup: 1999

National
COSAFA Cup: 1999, 2001, 2004

References

External links
 Girabola.com - Akwá 
 Yahoo! sports profile 
 Football - Akwá, Petro's New Reinforcement AllAfrica.com, 5 June 2007

1977 births
Living people
People from Benguela
Angolan footballers
Association football forwards
S.L. Benfica footballers
F.C. Alverca players
Associação Académica de Coimbra – O.A.F. players
Qatar SC players
Al-Wakrah SC players
Al-Gharafa SC players
Atlético Petróleos de Luanda players
Girabola players
Primeira Liga players
Qatar Stars League players
Angola international footballers
1996 African Cup of Nations players
1998 African Cup of Nations players
2006 Africa Cup of Nations players
2006 FIFA World Cup players
Angolan expatriate footballers
Angolan expatriate sportspeople in Portugal
Angolan expatriate sportspeople in Qatar
Expatriate footballers in Portugal
Expatriate footballers in Qatar